Marmorerpeton is an extinct genus of prehistoric stem group-salamanders that lived in Britain during the Bathonian stage of the Middle Jurassic. They are among the oldest known salamanders. Two species were named when the genus was first described by Susan E. Evans et al. in 1988, M. freemani, and M. kermacki, from fragmentary remains found via screenwashing in the Forest Marble Formation of England. Due to the size of their osteocytic lacunae suggesting a large genome size and some morphological characters, like the presence of calcified cartilage in the medulla of its humerus, it was assumed that Marmorerpeton was neotenic. New more complete remains of a new species M. wakei were described in 2022 from the Kilmaluag Formation of the Isle of Skye, Scotland. These conclusively demonstrated that Marmorerpeton was neotenic, and was a member of the family Karauridae, with the other two members of the family, Karaurus and Kokartus being known from the Middle-Late Jurassic of Central Asia. The teeth appear to have been weakly pedicellate.

References

Jurassic amphibians of Europe
Fossil taxa described in 1988
Prehistoric amphibian genera